Doctors is a British medical soap opera which began broadcasting on BBC One on 26 March 2000. Set in the fictional West Midlands town of Letherbridge, the soap follows the lives of the staff and patients of the Riverside Health Centre, a fictional NHS doctor's surgery. The following is a list of characters that first appeared in Doctors in 2000, by order of first appearance. All characters are introduced by the programme's executive producer, Mal Young. The original nine regular characters to be introduced in Doctors were Mac McGuire (Christopher Timothy), Steve Rawlings (Mark Frost), Helen Thompson (Corrinne Wicks), Rana Mistry (Akbar Kurtha), Caroline Powers (Jacqueline Leonard), Kate McGuire (Maggie Cronin), Anoushka Flynn (Carli Norris), Ruth Harding (Yvonne Brewster) and Joanna Helm (Sarah Manners). Later in the year, Patrick McGuire (Alan McKenna) was introduced.

Mac McGuire

Dr. Brendan "Mac" McGuire, portrayed by Christopher Timothy, first appeared on 26 March 2000, and made his last appearance on 26 May 2006.

Mac is twice-married, first to Julia Parsons (Diane Keen) in 1968, to whom he had three children, sons Patrick (Alan McKenna) and Liam (Tim Matthews), and daughter Samantha. In 1995, Mac marries Kate (Maggie Cronin), with whom he has one son, Ciaran (Tomas Hughes), whose birth led to Mac becoming an alcoholic. This marriage only lasted seven years when in 2002, Kate has an affair with a priest, resulting in Mac having a heart attack. The near-death experience resulted in Mac confiding in Julia. Mac then remarries Julia in 2004, but the pair divorce in 2007. Mac becomes friends with Dr Peter Kendrick (Robert Cavanah), however Peter became depressed and soon committed suicide. On 26 May 2006, Mac leaves Letherbridge, moving to Ireland, after Julia orders him and Kate to leave when she discovers he had an affair with Kate.

Development and reception

In the press release for Doctors in March 2000, Timothy was said to be "thrilled" to be on the show adding, "On set there's an amazing sense of drama and commitment from everyone around. People really want it to be a success". Described as an "old-fashioned and highly-respected physician who isn't afraid to speak his mind", Timothy added that Brendan (known to his colleagues as "Mac"), is "James Herriot grown older". In an interview with Sussex Life, Timothy stated of his time on Doctors that he loved "the dramatic standards achieved by the fast-paced series, despite the kind of squeeze on time and resources unheard of" adding, "The budget was a joke and the pressure more intense than anything I’d ever experienced. But it was six years of great fun and I got to direct, which I loved". When asked if he had picked up any medical knowledge from the role he said, "No, not really. I spent a week with a real vet in Yorkshire and a day with a real GP in his surgery but I didn’t really watch procedures. The actual procedures – how to take blood pressure and that sort of thing – I picked up as I went along". He added that; "Working in something like Doctors you learn your lines, you say the scene and then forget them because you then have to remember another scene, and another scene". Head of Drama Mal Young said Timothy sat in a consultation room for a day, adding that people were "very good and mostly unfazed by the sight of an actor listening, they were very understanding, especially one woman who came in to talk about hormone replacement therapy!". TV Choice Nick Fiaca commented that Julia had a "torrid time" with Mac. In 2010, producer Peter Eryl Lloyd was asked by Digital Spy if Mac was to return, in which he replied, "I don't know why we'd do that unless there was a very good reason. The show has moved on since Chris was with us so I don't think anyone would want the character back just out of nostalgia. But if it's motivated, if it has an impact on our characters and makes sense dramatically, then never say never". The British Theatre Guide, said Mac was "very successful".

At the 2003 British Soap Awards, Timothy was nominated for Best Actor, but lost out to Brian Capron who played Coronation Street Richard Hillman. Again, in 2004 and 2005, he was nominated for Best Actor, but Shane Richie who plays EastEnders Alfie Moon won both of the 2004 and 2005 awards. In the 2006 awards, he was nominated for "Best Actor" but lost out to Ross Kemp who played EastEnders Grant Mitchell. In the same 2006 awards, Timothy and Robert Cavanah who played Dr Peter Kendrick were nominated for "Best Storyline", in which Kendrick committed suicide, however Justin Burton (Chris Fountain) and Becca Hayton's (Ali Bastian) affair in Hollyoaks won.

Steve Rawlings
Dr Steve Rawlings, portrayed by Mark Frost, first appeared on 26 March 2000, and made his last appearance on 1 June 2001. In the press release for Doctors, it was revealed that actor Frost would be playing Steve. Frost played Steve for 18 months, with Steve being called a "hard man" and a "baddie". Birmingham Post Caroline Foulke said that Frost played "blokes that are naughty and shady" and that Steve would make "Phil (Steve McFadden) and Grant Mitchell (Ross Kemp) look like pussycats".

Helen Thompson

Dr. Helen Thompson, portrayed by Corrinne Wicks, first appeared on 26 March 2000, and made her last appearance on 16 December 2005.

Before the series began, Helen married Phil (Mark Adams), with whom she had two children, a son Dan (Joshua Prime) and a daughter Claire (Tara Coleman-Starr). In 2002, Helen becomes a widow when Phil is killed in a car crash. However, at the time of the crash, she is in bed with colleague Marc Elliot (Tom Butcher), and is riddled with guilt until she discovers that Phil was also guilty, hiding the fact he has a second family. Helen and Marc set up "Best Practice" together and start a relationship. Over time, Helen grows to dislike Marc and claims she is not in love with him anymore, and Marc leaves to build orphanages in Kosovo. In 2004, Helen falls in love with Dr. Jack Ford (Steven Hartley) and he proposed to her, with Helen agreeing. However, Jack is murdered by his former wife Ria (Mandana Jones), devastating Helen. The next year, Marc returns with a new fiancé, Bella Forest (Sharon Maharaj). However, Marc and Helen realise that they still have feelings for each other, so the pair leave Letherbridge.

Development
Helen's character profile on the BBC website describes her as an "extremely capable doctor and well-liked by her patients and colleagues", but "despite being strong and confident, she sometimes found it hard to show her feelings".  In November 2005, Digital Spy Kris Green reported that Wicks would be departing from Doctors alongside Tom Butcher. Green commented that Helen has "been the unluckiest person in love for the last five years" and was glad that she was "finally" getting a "Prince Charming". Her final episode was an hour-long special. In real life, Wicks is married to Butcher, with Green commenting on this saying, "Interestingly, for Corrinne and Tom, it’s life imitating art as they are, in fact, a couple in ‘real world’ – I do sometimes find it hard to distinguish between the two...". Andrea Green who played Sarah Finch opined that her most memorable scene was "the very final scene of Doctors shot at Pebble Mill – it was with my friend Wicks", commenting that it was "weird".

Rana Mistry
Dr. Rana Mistry, portrayed by Akbar Kurtha, first appeared on 26 March 2000, and made his last appearance 1 June 2001. Rana is a general practitioner, who gets into a relationship with Anoushka Flynn (Carli Norris). Anoushka cheats on Rana with Steve Rawlings (Mark Frost), and when she gets pregnant and does not know who the father is, she leaves Letherbridge.

Caroline Powers

Dr. Caroline Powers, portrayed by Jacqueline Leonard, first appeared on 26 March 2000, and made her last appearance on 1 June 2001. An experienced doctor, Caroline is involved in many cases, such as when Noel Kenworth (Anthony Edridge) has a vasectomy, however his wife, Karen (Karen Henthorn), still wants children. In May 2001, Caroline's mother, Jane (Stefanie Powers) arrives from America, with her soon to be husband David Wilde (Darren Day) arriving shortly after. Caroline starts to have feelings for David, and the two have sex. On Jane and David's wedding day, Caroline runs away with David.

Development
In a press release for the announcement of Doctors, it was stated that Leonard, known for her role in EastEnders playing Lorraine Wicks, was cast in the role of Caroline. Leonard had taken a year off from acting, after previously caring for her sick mother, however Leonard started to worry that as she was "missing out on bigger roles, and she grew concerned that casting directors only saw her as Lorraine". She said, "The right job never seemed to come up, I went up for things like Coronation Street and always got down to the last few, but never quite got it, almost like my profile was too high", she finished in saying, "Doctors came along at exactly the right time", stating she felt "lucky" and that she is "the happiest I've been in a long time". She added, "There's a lot of humour on the set of Doctors, we're a good melting pot of people from all over, which reflects the cosmopolitan nature of the series". The BBC described her character as "demanding", Daily Mirror describes her as "hard-drinking" and "hard-talking", and Leonard said she is a "dark horse who is giving out a lot of signals, right from the very beginning".

Kate McGuire

Kate McGuire, portrayed by Maggie Cronin, first appeared on 26 March 2000, and made her last appearance on 26 May 2006.

Kate is the wife of Mac McGuire (Christopher Timothy) and set up Riverside with him. The two had a son, Ciaran (Tomas Hughes), but they divorced when Kate fell in love with David Quinn (Richard Standing). However, David dies in a car crash, and Kate leaves the church. Ciaran was later kidnapped, however when he was returned, she regained her belief in the church. After a two-month gap, Kate returns to "Best Practice" as the new receptionist. Mac remarries his ex-wife, Julia Parsons (Diane Keen), as she becomes the practice manager at the surgery. Kate and Julia become enemies as Kate still had feelings for Mac, which Julia knows about, but the pair soon become friends. Kate meets Dr Mike Miles (Michael J. Jackson) and moves to Ireland with him. Whilst in Ireland, Mac visits Ciaran and has an affair with her whilst there. Julia finds out, ordering them to leave the surgery, and both depart to Ireland.

At the 2003 British Soap Awards, Cronin was nominated for Best Actress, but Kacey Ainsworth who played EastEnders Little Mo Mitchell won, and again in the 2004 British Soap Awards, but Suranne Jones who played Coronation Street Karen McDonald won. In the 2003 British Soap Awards, Cronin was also nominated for Villain of the Year, but Brian Capron who played Coronation Street Richard Hillman won.

Anoushka Flynn
Anoushka Flynn, portrayed by Carli Norris, first appeared on 26 March 2000, and made her last appearance on 19 May 2000. Anoushka is a nurse at the Riverside Medical Practice. On her BBC profile, Anoushka is described as pushy and provocative. Her simultaneous relationships with colleagues Steve Rawlings (Mark Frost) and Rana Mistry (Akbar Kurtha) are noted in the profile. Her affairs leas to Anoushka getting pregnant; since she does not know who the father is, Anoushka resigns from her job and begins a new life elsewhere in order to care for her baby. This was due to not wanting to suffer "inevitable blame and investigations". After making her final appearance on 19 May 2000, Anoushka became the first original character to leave Doctors.

Ruth Harding
Ruth Harding, portrayed by Yvonne Brewster, first appeared on 26 March 2000, and made her last appearance on 30 April 2001. When the team decide to participate in a lottery syndicate, Ruth agrees to buy the ticket. The numbers match and they win, but nobody pays her for their part in the ticket, so she claims
the money and leaves Letherbridge.

Joanna Helm

Joanna Helm, portrayed by Sarah Manners, first appeared on 26 March 2000, and made her last appearance on 1 June 2001. Joanna is a receptionist at the surgery, the first that the surgery had. Joanna meets her grandmother Jessie (Marcia Ashton), and when she looks at Jessie's medical records, she finds out that she is dying of a brain tumour. Jessie tells Joanna that she knows she is dying and asks Joanna to help her die. Joanna helps Jessie die and pretends to be upset when she is told that Jessie died overnight. However, when Jessie's nurse takes a look at how she died, she suspects foul play. Mac McGuire (Christopher Timothy) is suspected of killing Jessie, but he is later cleared. Due to the guilt, Joanna begins taking drugs, stealing them from the surgery. She subscribes to more drugs, forging signatures of doctors at the surgery, and eventually takes an overdose, nearly dying. She later confesses to the death of her nan, all part of an euthanasia pact, and is dismissed by Mac.

Development
Joanna was described as "troubled" and "dippy". Manners also opined that Joanna caused "mischief". Wales Online described Joanna as "bubbly". According to Daily Mirror, Manners "won herself an army of male fans" as Joanna, as she was "flirty". Sunday Mail described her storylines, "She was involved in mercy killing, drug addiction and a suicide attempt to name but a few of her spicier plotlines". Manners said of this, "I got the best storylines in the world in Doctors, my nan died of a brain tumour then it came out I killed her. I went mad and was addicted to anti-depressants, forged signatures and tried to kill myself". When it was announced that Manners was to join Casualty after she had departed the show, the Sunday Mail said, "That spells trouble for everyone if her medical record is anything to go by" and similarly when Manners joined The Bill after she departed the show, The Metro said that Manners "rose to fame" whilst on the show.

Patrick McGuire

Patrick McGuire, portrayed by Alan McKenna, first appeared on 16 November 2000, and made his last appearance on 16 March 2012.

Patrick, Mac McGuire's (Christopher Timothy) and Julia Parsons (Diane Keen) son, visits Mac in 2000. In 2003, he returns with his wife Sally (Zoë Tyler) and his sister Sam (Louise Howells). He stays for his father and mothers wedding before leaving. During the time that Patrick is absent, Julia and Mac split, and Mac moves to Ireland. Patrick returns in June 2010, when he becomes concerned about his mother's health when she starts to act differently, with Julia thinking that Charlie Bradfield (Philip McGough) is Mac. He continues to look after Julia, after she is diagnosed with lyme disease.

Two months later he returns, with daughter Chloe (Siena Pugsley), taking Chloe to Julia's house. Patrick and Sally (now played by Jo-Anne Stockham), stay with Julia; experiencing problems with their marriage, which Julia notices. Julia discovers he is having an affair, after he is involved in a car crash, finding out that he was with a woman named Sian in the car. Although Patrick is unharmed, he tries to defend himself towards Julia, begging Julia not to tell Sally. She agrees as long as it never happens again. Patrick commits to his relationship with Sally, and along with her and Chloe, they leave.

However, after Julia comes back from holiday, she finds her house unlocked, with bottles and clothes littering her house. She figures out he is back with Sian, and orders him to explain. when Sally finds out about Patrick' affair, and that Julia knew about it, she takes Chloe and Patrick goes AWOL. Julia forces Sally and Patrick to sort out their differences, after it is affecting Chloe's behaviour, after they do, the three leave together. He appears once more when Julia is hospitalized after a car crash, after she recovers, he leaves.

Reception
In a poll conducted by Digital Spy, the five main soaps in the UK, Coronation Street, Emmerdale, EastEnders, Hollyoaks and Doctors storylines were judged by viewers of the website, with the Doctors storyline of Julia finding out about Patrick being involved in a car crash, coming last with 0.9% of the vote. Again, in a poll conducted by Digital Spy, the Doctors storyline of Julia finding out about Patrick having another affair, coming last with 0.8% of the vote. Finally, the Doctors storyline of Julia hiding the secret of Patrick's affair from Patrick came last with 1.1% of the vote.

Other characters

References

Doctors
2000
, Doctors